Pilsbryspira is a genus of small predatory sea snails, marine gastropod mollusks in the family Pseudomelatomidae.

Species
Species within the genus Pilsbryspira include:
 Pilsbryspira albiguttata (Pilsbry, 1904)
 Pilsbryspira albinodata (Reeve, 1846)
 Pilsbryspira albocincta (C. B. Adams, 1845)
 Pilsbryspira albomaculata (d'Orbigny, 1842)
 Pilsbryspira amathea (Dall, 1919)
 Pilsbryspira arsinoe (Dall, 1919)
 Pilsbryspira aterrima (Sowerby I, 1834)
 Pilsbryspira atramentosa (Smith E. A., 1882)
 Pilsbryspira auberti (Lamy, 1934)
 Pilsbryspira aureonodosa (Pilsbry & Lowe, 1932)
 Pilsbryspira bacchia (Dall, 1919)
 Pilsbryspira cinerea (Weinkauff, 1876)
 Pilsbryspira collaris (Sowerby I, 1834)
 Pilsbryspira elozantha (Ravenel, 1861)
 Pilsbryspira flucki (Brown & Pilsbry, 1913)
 Pilsbryspira garciacubasi Shasky, 1971
 Pilsbryspira jayana (Adams C. B., 1850)
 Pilsbryspira kandai (Kuroda, 1950)
 Pilsbryspira leucocyma (Dall, 1884)
 Pilsbryspira loxospira (Pilsbry & Lowe, 1932)
 Pilsbryspira melchersi (Menke, 1852)
 Pilsbryspira monilis (Bartsch & Rehder, 1939)
 Pilsbryspira nodata (C. B. Adams, 1850)
 Pilsbryspira nymphia (Pilsbry & Lowe, 1932)
 Pilsbryspira umbrosa (Melvill, 1923)
 Pilsbryspira zebroides (Weinkauff & Kobelt, 1876)
Species brought into synonymy
 Pilsbryspira albomaculata (Orbigny, 1842): synonym of Pilsbryspira nodata (C. B. Adams, 1850)
 Pilsbryspira albopustulata Smith, 1882: synonym of Pilsbryspira nodata (C. B. Adams, 1850)
 Pilsbryspira atrior Adams, 1852: synonym of Pilsbryspira aterrima (Sowerby I, 1834)
 Pilsbryspira fonseca Pilsbry & Lowe, 1932: synonym of Pilsbryspira atramentosa (E.A. Smith, 1882)
 Pilsbryspira maura Kiener, 1840: synonym of Pilsbryspira aterrima (Sowerby I, 1834)
 Pilsbryspira nephele Dall, 1919: synonym of Pilsbryspira collaris (Sowerby I, 1834)
 Pilsbryspira ornata D'Orbigny, 1847: synonym of Pilsbryspira albocincta (C. B. Adams, 1845)
 Pilsbryspira pilsbryi Bartsch, 1950: synonym of Pilsbryspira nodata (C. B. Adams, 1850)
 Pilsbryspira rustica Carpenter, 1857: synonym of Pilsbryspira aterrima (Sowerby I, 1834)
 Pilsbryspira zebra Lamarck, J.B.P.A. de, 1822 (nomen dubium): synonym of Pilsbryspira leucocyma (Dall, 1884)

References

External links
 
 Bouchet, P.; Kantor, Y. I.; Sysoev, A.; Puillandre, N. (2011). A new operational classification of the Conoidea (Gastropoda). Journal of Molluscan Studies. 77(3): 273-308
 Worldwide Mollusc Species Data Base: Pseudomelatomidae

 
Gastropod genera